The February 2016 North American winter storm was a strong winter storm that caused more than 70,000 people in southern California to lose their electricity, with many broken trees and electrical lines in that area, with the Southern Rocky Mountains having the potential to receive some of the greatest snowfall from the system. One person in San Diego, California area died when a tree fell on their car. Another person in Minnesota died after being struck by a car while crossing a street.

Meteorological history 
The storm first developed late on January 29 near California and started to track east and brought heavy snow and wind to parts of the Southwest. It also brought severe weather to parts of the South on February 2. As the system tracked northeast into Canada, it brought rain to most of the Mid-Atlantic, Northeast, and New England, which had already been hit by a previous historic storm about a week prior to this. After the storm complex had moved into Canada, the cold front associated with it stalled over the East Coast late on February 4. A new low pressure developed off North Carolina that night and started to track up the coast. It impacted areas already hit hard by the previous blizzard about two weeks prior, and caused messy travel along Interstate 95 in the Mid-Atlantic and Northeast areas.

Impact 

A blizzard watch was issued for February 2 north and west of Des Moines.

Along with the aforementioned deaths, on February 5 two people were killed in Canton, Massachusetts when hit by heavy tree branches covered in heavy snow. In New York City, a person was killed when a huge construction crane, in the midst of being moved and secured due to the weather, collapsed and fell on him. In Broomall, Pennsylvania, a 90-foot beech tree fell down on a house, killing an elderly couple.

On February 1, over 500 airplane flights were canceled at Denver Airport.

Severe weather in the South
The storm also produced severe weather across the South on the evening of February 2, including 11 tornadoes, some of which were strong and caused considerable damage in and around Alabama and Mississippi towns of Collinsville, Scooba, and McMullen. More storms had affected the southeast region on February 3. Flooding also impacted the south including Georgia. On the 3rd, an EF0 tornado occurred near Columbia, South Carolina, and an EF1 caused damage in Fort Stewart, Georgia. Tornadoes resulted in no fatalities but 2 injuries.

February 2 event

February 3 event

See also 
 January 2016 United States blizzard
 Early January 2017 North American winter storm
 Mid-January 2017 North American ice storm
 February 9–11, 2017 North American blizzard
 February 12–14, 2017 North American blizzard

Notes

References

External links 
 Winter Storm Kayla 
 Winter Storm Lexi

2015–16 North American winter
2016 meteorology
2016 natural disasters in the United States
Blizzards in the United States
February 2016 events in the United States
January 2016 events in the United States
Natural disasters in Colorado
Natural disasters in California
Natural disasters in Mississippi